This is a list of world champion football club winning managers. It includes victories in the Intercontinental Cup (defunct) and the FIFA Club World Cup.

Carlos Bianchi, Pep Guardiola and Carlo Ancelotti are the most successful managers, claiming three titles each. Six managers also won the competitions twice: five achieved two consecutive titles, while Sir Alex Ferguson became the only manager to win both Intercontinental Cup and Club World Cup. , Argentinean managers have won more tournaments than any other nationality, securing twelve world titles, while Brazilian managers are closely behind with ten competition victories and Italian with nine. Sir Alex Ferguson is the only manager to have won both world champion titles.

Winning managers

The following lists are correct as of the conclusion of the 2020 FIFA Club World Cup.

By number of titles
Key

By nationality
This table lists the total number of titles won by managers of each nationality.

References

External links

Lists of association football managers
Intercontinental Cup (football)
FIFA Club World Cup